Typhoon Soudelor, known in the Philippines as Typhoon Egay, was a powerful typhoon that underwent rapid deepening east of Taiwan in the 2003 Pacific typhoon season. It was the sixth named storm by the Japan Meteorological Agency (JMA) of the season, as well as the third typhoon. It formed on June 12 from a disturbance in the monsoon trough, located east of the Philippines. The system moved generally to the northwest after its genesis, gradually intensifying into a tropical storm. While offshore the Philippines, Soudelor dropped heavy rainfall that caused flooding and left thousands homeless. The storm caused $2.46 million in damage, and 12 deaths.

After affecting the Philippines, Soudelor moved into an area of low wind shear and with favorable outflow. It became a typhoon on June 17, and quickly developed an eye while rapidly intensifying. The storm struck the Japanese island of Iriomote-jima, where wind gusts reached 204 km/h (127 mph). It also affected Taiwan, where floods covered highways and caused mudslides. Early on June 18, Soudelor reached peak 10-minute sustained winds of 150 km/h (90 mph). Subsequently, an increase in shear and the passage of a trough weakened the typhoon and caused it to turn to the northeast. Soudelor weakened to a tropical storm on June 19, and subsequently it passed between Japan and South Korea. It became an extratropical cyclone that day, dissipating on June 24. In Japan, the storm caused widespread power outages, although damage was minimal, and there were 21 injuries. In South Korea, there was $12.1 million in damage and two deaths.

Meteorological history

The origins of Soudelor were from a tropical disturbance that persisted a short distance northwest of Pohnpei on June 7. By two days later, it had a large area of convection, and it moved generally westward. Late on June 9, the Joint Typhoon Warning Center (JTWC) issued a tropical cyclone formation alert (TCFA), although the system initially failed to develop due to wind shear in the region. The thunderstorms decreased over the increasingly exposed circulation. On June 11, the shear decreased, and convection became better organized. The JTWC initiated warnings on Tropical Depression 07W late that day, and at 0000 UTC on June 12, the Japan Meteorological Agency (JMA) also remarked that a tropical depression had formed to the northeast of Palau.

After forming, the depression tracked generally westward due to a subtropical ridge to the north. Around that time, it was still located within the monsoon trough, and it interacted with another circulation to its east-southeast, causing a motion to the west-northwest. As it moved away from the other circulation, the depression was able to intensify, and the wind shear decreased. On June 13 the JMA upgraded the depression to Tropical Storm Soudelor to the east of Samar Island in the Philippines. That day, the Philippine Atmospheric, Geophysical and Astronomical Services Administration PAGASA initiated advisories and gave it the local name "Egay". Upon becoming a tropical storm, Soudelor developed rainbands to the north and south, although it could not intensify significantly due to a tropical upper tropospheric trough to the east. A mid-latitude trough to the north weakened the ridge, which allowed Soudelor to turn more to the northwest off the northeast coast of the Philippines. The circulation became exposed from the deepest convection, and around that time the storm was located about 160 km (100 mi) east of Samar Island. Thunderstorms gradually increased, and the outflow improved. Late on June 16, the JTWC upgraded Soudelor to a typhoon, and the next day the JMA followed suit when the storm was located southeast of Taiwan.

Around the time that Soudelor became a typhoon, it began moving toward the north, influenced by an approaching trough, and it passed about 95 km (60 mi) northeast of Luzon. A ragged eye developed early on June 17, which quickly became better organized. With its outflow enhanced by the approaching trough, Soudelor rapidly intensified to the east of Taiwan. The typhoon struck the Japanese island of Iriomote-jima at around 2030 UTC on June 17. At 0600 UTC on June 18, the JTWC estimated peak 1‑minute winds of 215 km/h (135 mph). At the same time, JMA estimated peak 10‑minute winds of 150 km/h (90 mph) when it was located west of Okinawa. While at its maximum strength, Soudelor had a circular eye 33 km (21 mi) in diameter. It turned to the north-northeast, maintaining its peak winds for about 12 hours before increased shear from the westerlies caused weakening. The eye quickly dissipated, and the system began transitioning into an extratropical cyclone. Early on June 19, the JMA downgraded Soudelor below typhoon status, and the storm later crossed Tsushima Island into the Sea of Japan. At 1500 UTC that day, the JMA declared the storm as extratropical while it was near the Oki Islands; the JTWC followed suit three hours later. The extratropical remnants of Soudelor continued to the northeast, crossing northern Japan on June 20. The storm slowed and turned to the east, dissipating on June 24.

Preparations

By June 16, PAGASA raised storm signal number 3 for Batanes and the provinces of Cagayan and Isabela; storm signal number 2 for all or portions of nine provinces and for Polillo Island; and storm signal number 1 was raised for portions of four provinces. The signals refer to the potential for winds, from lowest to highest representing weakest to strongest winds; number 3 refers to the potential for winds of  within 18 hours.

On June 16, the Central Weather Bureau issued sea and land warnings in Taiwan as Soudelor was anticipated to produce torrential rains, gale-force winds, and rough seas. All fishermen in the area were urged to return to port before the onset of the typhoon. As the typhoon tracked near Taiwan, the Japan Meteorological Agency began advising residents in Okinawa to closely monitor the storm. One of the major airlines in Japan, All Nippon Airways, cancelled 66 domestic flights the same day, stranding an estimated 6,000 people. During the storm, 257 domestic flights were canceled, and train and ferry service was canceled. In Nagasaki Prefecture, 732 schools were closed during the storm. Hundreds of people voluntarily evacuated in Japan.

On June 17, the Korean Meteorological Agency issued rain warnings for Jeju Island and coastal areas of South Korea. They also urged residents to take all precautions for the storm. The Korea Airports Corporation reported that 111 flights to southern areas of the country were cancelled due to the typhoon.

Impact and aftermath

While Soudelor was moving to the northwest off the east coast of the Philippines, it dropped heavy rainfall, including  in 24 hours in Catarman, Northern Samar. Rainfall in six hours reached  at Virac Airport. The rains caused flooding throughout the Philippines, which left thousands of people homeless. Throughout the country, the storm damaged 157 houses and destroyed 94. Soudelor also left crop damage. An estimated 45,400 people were affected by Soudelor. Overall damage was estimated at ₱131 million (2003 Philippine pesos, $2.46 million 2003 USD). There were 12 deaths, with two missing, as well as two people injured.

In Taiwan, Soudelor dropped heavy rainfall that resulted in flooding and landslides. One of the mudslides covered a  section of the Yenhsi Highway between Hsitou and Luku. Road crews were quickly dispatched to the area but had to suspend cleanup efforts due to continuing impacts from Soudelor. Dozens of tour buses carrying tourists who were being evacuated from the mountains were blocked several times by mudslides covering roads. The Sungshan Airport in Taipei was shut down during the morning of June 19 due to unsettled weather produced by the typhoon. The Feitsui Dam increased by  due to the storm's rainfall, raising it to near peak capacity.

For eight hours, the Japanese island of Iriomote-jima reported gale-force winds, except for during the eye passage of Soudelor. The island reported sustained winds of 108 km/h (67 mph), with gusts to 204 km/h (127 mph). On Ishigaki Island, the storm caused ¥77.9 million (2003 JPY, $655,000 2003 USD) in agriculture damage, mostly from high waves. A North Korean cargo ship was stranded off the northwest coast of Japan after being refused entry into the Japanese port of Toyama. During the storm, about 10,000 houses lost power, including 3,400 houses in Okinawa Prefecture. Damage was minor, with only 26 damaged houses, varying from blown off roof tiles to shattered windows. Soudelor injured 21 people in the country, mostly due to falling objects. There were at least 22 landslides nationwide. Four bridges along the Yoshino River were flooded during the storm.

The storm also caused  seas. Typhoon Soudelor killed two people in South Korea and caused $12.1 million in damages.

See also
Other storms of the same name

Notes

References

External links 

JMA General Information of Typhoon Soudelor (0306) from Digital Typhoon
JMA Best Track Data of Typhoon Soudelor (0306) 
JMA Best Track Data (Graphics) of Typhoon Soudelor (0306)
JMA Best Track Data (Text)
JTWC Best Track Data  of Typhoon 07W (Soudelor)
07W.SOUDELOR from the U.S. Naval Research Laboratory

2003 Pacific typhoon season
Typhoons in Taiwan
Typhoons in Japan
Typhoons in South Korea
2003 in Taiwan
Typhoons
2003 disasters in the Philippines
Typhoons in the Philippines
Soudelor
2003 disasters in Taiwan
2003 disasters in South Korea
2003 disasters in Japan